The Best and the Brightest is a 2010 American independent film. Directed by Josh Shelov, the film stars Neil Patrick Harris and Bonnie Somerville as Jeff and Sam respectively, a young couple that moves into New York City. The film centers around the effort they have to put in to get their five-year-old daughter Beatrice (Amelia Talbot) into an elite private kindergarten.

This is director Josh Shelov's debut feature-film, co-written with Michael Jaeger.

Plot

The film opens with Jeff (Neil Patrick Harris) and Sam (Bonnie Somerville) moving from Delaware into New York City with their five-year-old daughter Beatrice. Sam takes Beatrice on visit to several schools in the city to get Beatrice admitted for the current session, only to realize that there is very little prospect in such short period. After losing hope, she enlists help of Sue Lemon (Amy Sedaris), a consultant who helps couples in getting their kids admitted into schools. Though first Sue declines to help them for citing short notice, later she agrees after seeing Sam's stubborn determination.

Sue asks Jeff, who is a software programmer, to mention poetry as his profession. Jeff initially declines, however, Sam convinces him. On the day of first interview, Jeff and Sam asks Clark (Peter Serafinowicz), Jeff's college mate, to baby-sit Beatrice and leave her with him. During the visit, Clark shares a copy of sex chat he had with a prostitute with Jeff. Later at school, the couple is interviewed by Katharine Heilmann (Jenna Stern) who mistakes Clark's sex chat print copy for a poem written by Jeff and is visibly impressed. However, a freak incident involving Clark makes her decline Jeff and Sam's application.

Upon failing to impress Katharine, Sam and Sue decide and plan to befriend The Player (Christopher McDonald), a rich guy who is also chairman of school committee. Thus begins a series of comic plays and lies that the couple has to go through to get approval of The Player, The Player's wife (Kate Mulgrew), and Katharine. Sam is forced to choose between living the life she has dreamed of – but lying in order to do so – or going back to Delaware as herself.

Cast
 Neil Patrick Harris as Jeff
 Bonnie Somerville as Sam
  Amelia Talbot as Beatrice
 Amy Sedaris as Sue Lemon
 Jenna Stern as Katharine Heilmann
 Peter Serafinowicz as Clark
 Christopher McDonald as The Player
 Kate Mulgrew as The Player's Wife
 Bridget Regan as Robin, Jeff's college crush

Production
Film's casting was done by Jessica Kelly and Suzzane Smith (credited as Suzanne Smith Crowley).

Several scenes were filmed in the historic Bryn Mawr College in Bryn Mawr, Pennsylvania

Reception

On Metacritic the film has a score of 26% based on reviews from 14 critics, indicating "generally unfavorable reviews".

References

External links
 

2010 films
American comedy films
American independent films
2010 comedy films
2010s English-language films
Films set in New York City
Films shot in Philadelphia
2010 independent films
2010s American films